{{Infobox information appliance
| name = Samsung Galaxy Tab E 9.6
| logo = Samsung Galaxy Tab new logo.png
| aka = SM-T560 (WiFi)  SM-T561 (3G & WiFi)
| manufacturer = Samsung Electronics
| family = Galaxy Tab
| type = Tablet computer
| lifespan = 3 years
| discontinued = Never
| media = 
| os = SM-T560NU (US & Canada): Android 4.4.4 "KitKat", upgradable to 7.1.1 "Nougat".All other models: Android 4.4.4 "KitKat"
| power = 5,000 mAh Li-Ion battery
| soc = Spreadtrum SC7730SE
Qualcomm APQ8016 (USA)) (Snapdragon 400/410)
| cpu = 1.3GHz: Quad-Core Cortex A7 
| memory = 1.5 GB
| storage = 8/16 GB flash memory,microSDXC slot (up to 128 GB)
| display = 1280x800 px (157 ppi), diagonal, TFT LCD
| graphics = ARM Mali-400MP4 GPU (Adreno 306)
| sound = Built-in stereo
| input = Multi-touch screen, digital compass, proximity and ambient light sensors, accelerometer
| camera = 5.0MP AF rear facing, 2 MP front facing
| connectivity = * HSPA+ 21, 5.76 Mbit/s quad 850, 900, 1900, 2100 MHz (3G, Wi-Fi model)
 EDGE/GPRS quad 850, 900, 1800, 1900 MHz (3G, Wi-Fi model)
 Wi-Fi 802.11a/b/g/n (2.4, 5 GHz), Bluetooth 4.0, HDMI (external cable)
 GPS
| dimensions =  H W D
| weight = WiFi:  3G: 
| predecessor = Samsung Galaxy Tab 4 10.1
| successor = Samsung Galaxy Tab A 10.1
| related = Samsung Galaxy Tab S2 9.7  Samsung Galaxy Tab S2 8.0  Samsung Galaxy Tab A 9.7  Samsung Galaxy Tab A 8.0
| website = 
| releasedate = 
| price = $150 media price
| unitsshipped = 
| service = 
}}
The Samsung Galaxy Tab E 9.6''' is a 9.6-inch Android-based tablet computer produced and marketed by Samsung Electronics. It belongs to the entry-level "E" line of the Samsung Galaxy Tab series. It was announced on June 16, 2015 and released on 1 July 2015. It is available in Wi-Fi  only and Wi-Fi/4G variants.

Features
Samsung originally released the Galaxy Tab E 9.6 with Android 4.4.4 KitKat and customized the interface with its TouchWiz software. As well as the standard suite of Google apps, it has Samsung apps such as ChatON, S Suggest, S Voice, S Translator, S Planner, WatchON, Smart Stay, Multi-Window, Group Play, All Share Play.

The Galaxy Tab E 9.6 is available in WiFi-only and 3G & WiFi variants. Storage is 8 GB or 16GB, depending on the model, with a microSDXC card slot for expansion up to 128 GB. It has a 9.6-inch TFT LCD screen with a resolution of 1280x800 pixels and a pixel density of 157 ppi. It also features a 2 MP front camera without flash and a rear-facing 5.0 MP AF camera without flash.

The US and Canadian model (SM-T560NU) received official Android updates to Lollipop, Marshmallow, Nougat. Models for other countries remained on KitKat.

See also
Comparison of tablet computers
Samsung Galaxy Tab series

References

Samsung Galaxy Tab series
Android (operating system) devices
Tablet computers introduced in 2015
Tablet computers